Otter Creek is a stream in the U.S. state of Georgia. It is a tributary to Seventeen Mile River.

An otter slide most likely accounts for the name.

References

Rivers of Georgia (U.S. state)
Rivers of Coffee County, Georgia